Hahnensee (Romansh: Lej dals Chöds) is a lake above St. Moritz in the Grisons, Switzerland at 2153 m above sealevel.

Next to the lake there is a restaurant of the same name. In the summer time, the area can be reached by several hiking trails. In the Winter skiers coming from the Piz Corvatsch can take the Giand'Alva skilift and ski down the almost 9 km long ski run, also called Hahnensee, into St. Mortitz-Bad. Though the run can only be opened after significant snowfall has accumulated.

References 

Hahnen
Lakes of Graubünden
St. Moritz